Alcides is a genus of moths.

Alcides may also refer to:
Alcidodes, a genus of weevils, previously known as Alcides
An alternative name for Heracles
Alcides Araújo Alves, known simply as Alcides (born 1985), a Brazilian footballer
Alcides Escobar (born 1886), Venezuelan baseball player